Violent Cases is a short graphic novel written by Neil Gaiman and illustrated by Dave McKean. It was McKean's first published work in comics. Though drawn by McKean in shades of blue, brown, and grey, when it was first published by Escape Books in 1987, it was printed in black-and-white. Later editions have been printed in colour.

A narrator, who is drawn to look like Gaiman, tells of how, as a small child in Portsmouth, he was taken by his father to be treated by an osteopath who was once employed by Al Capone. The nature of the narrator's relationship with his father, the tales the osteopath told, and the disturbing events that followed, are partially obscured by the narrator's imperfect recall of things he was not old enough to understand at the time.

The book won the 1988 Mekon Award for "Best British Work", presented by the Society of Strip Illustration. It was nominated for the 1992 Harvey Award for "Best Graphic Album: Previous Released Material".

Further reading 

Both The Tragical Comedy or Comical Tragedy of Mr. Punch and The Ocean at the End of the Lane are also set around Portsmouth and employs elements from Gaiman's childhood. The three works can be seen as parts of a trilogy.

References

External links
 Edward Carey: Examining Gaiman's Violent Cases with Peter Sanderson - Comic Book Resources, February 7, 2007.
 Violent Cases at ComicBookDB

Comics by Neil Gaiman
1987 graphic novels
1987 in comics
British graphic novels
Crime comics